This following is a list of the work released by German rock band Ton Steine Scherben. It is currently missing the (few) singles issued by the band.

Studio albums

Warum geht es mir so dreckig? (1971) (Why am I so miserable?)
Ich will nicht werden, was mein Alter ist (I don't wanna become what my old man is)
Warum geht es mir so dreckig (Why am I so miserable)
Der Kampf geht weiter (The struggle carries on)
Macht kaputt, was euch kaputt macht (Destroy what destroys you)
Einheitsfrontlied (Song of the united front, lyrics and music by Bertolt Brecht and Hanns Eisler)
Mein Name ist Mensch (My name is man)
Sklavenhändler (Slave trader)
Alles verändert sich (Everything is changing)
Solidarität (Solidarity)
Keine Macht für Niemand (1972) (No power for nobody)
Wir müssen hier raus! (We gotta get out of here!)
Feierabend (Quitting time)
Die letzte Schlacht gewinnen wir (We'll win the final battle)
Paul Panzers Blues ("Paul Panzer" was the synonym for Nikel Pallat/ see Trivia) 
Menschenjäger (Man hunter)
Allein machen sie dich ein (Alone we can't stand it)
Schritt für Schritt ins Paradies (Step by step into heaven)
Der Traum ist aus (The dream is over)
Mensch Meier
Rauch-Haus-Song
Keine Macht für Niemand (No power for nobody)
Komm schlaf bei mir (Stay with me tonight)
Wenn die Nacht am tiefsten… (1974) (When the night is at its darkest…)
Heute Nacht (Tonight)
Samstag Nachmittag (Saturday afternoon)
Guten Morgen (Good morning)
Durch Die Wüste (Through the desert)
Nimm Den Hammer (Take the hammer)
Ich Geh Weg (I'm leaving)
Halt Dich An Deiner Liebe Fest (Hang on to your love)
Wir Sind Im Licht (We are enlightened)
Wenn die Nacht am tiefsten (When it's darkest night)
Land in Sicht (Land in sight)
Komm an Bord (Come on board)
Steig Ein (Get in)
IV (1980)
Jenseits von Eden (East of Eden)
Bleib wo du bist (Stay where you are)
Sumpf Schlock
Der Turm stürzt ein (The tower collapses)
Wie in den Tagen Midians (As of the time of Midian)
Vorübergehend geschlossen (Temporarily closed)
Ebbe und Flut (Low and high tide)
Filmkuß (Movie kiss)
Der Fremde aus Indien (The stranger from India)
Kleine Freuden (Little pleasures)
Heimweh (Homesick)
Alles ist richtig (Everything is right)
S'is eben so (That's the way it is)
S.N.A.F.T (G.E.T.N.L.E.) (bases on a misspelling of "sanft" = gentle)
Kribbel Krabbel
Niemand liebt mich (Nobody loves me)
Da! (There!)
Morgenlicht (Morning light)
Ich hab nix (I've got nothing)
Gold
Wiedersehn (Goodbye)
(Auf ein) Happy-End ((Towards a) happy ending)
Scherben (1983) (Shards)
Wo sind wir jetzt (Where are we now)
Verboten (Forbidden)
Sternschnuppen (Shooting stars)
Regentag (Rainy day)
Laß uns ein Wunder sein (Let us be a miracle)
Mama war so (That's the way Mum was)
Tanz! (Dance!)
Traum ohne Stern (Dream without stars)
La Reponse (The response)
Mole Hill Rockers
Hau ab (Go away)
Fieber (Fever)
Ardistan 
Bist du's (Is it you)

Compilations
Auswahl I (1981)
Warum geht es mir so dreckig
Mein Name ist Mensch
Rauch Haus Song
Macht kaputt was euch kaputt macht
Wir streiken
Wenn die Nacht am tiefsten
Halt dich an deiner Liebe fest
Kribbel Krabbel
Guten Morgen
Keine Macht für Niemand

Live albums
In Berlin (Live) (1984)
Ich will nicht werden was mein Alter ist
Verboten
Feierabend
Heut' Nacht
Raus (aus dem Ghetto) (Out of the ghetto)
Ich will ich sein (I wanne be me)
Shit-Hit
Jenseits von Eden
La Reponse
Keine Macht für Niemand
Live I (1985)

The following albums were issued after the band ceased recording:
Live II (1996)
Wenn die Nacht am tiefsten
Wir müssen hier raus
Halt dich an deiner Liebe fest
Steig ein
Kleine Freuden
Bist du's
Kommen sie schnell
Der Traum ist aus
Land in Sicht
Live III (2006)
Wo sind wir jetzt
Hau ab
S.N.A.F.T.
Ardistan
Heimweh
Alles verändert sich
Durch die Wüste
Warum geht es mir so dreckig
Ebbe und Flut
Mein Name ist Mensch
Rauch-Haus-Song
Allein machen sie dich ein
Wiedersehn
Der Turm stürzt ein
Lass uns ein Wunder sein
Jetzt schlägt's dreizehn (The clock strikes thirteen)

Other
In 2006 the studio albums were re-issued, digitally remastered. Those parts of the last two studio albums for which the original recording session tapes remained in existence (about half of them having been destroyed in a fire) were also remixed, since the band had always been unhappy with quality of the original mixes. The packaging was made of paper instead of plastic, to resemble the original LP-wrapping. The box included 8 copies of original posters and an 80-page book with a short history of the band.

A year earlier, the CD "18 songs and 15 years" was published. The CD contained unreleased material, also digitally remastered.

Ton Steine Scherben
Blues discographies
Rock music group discographies
Folk music discographies